Bryce Campbell (born September 21, 1994) is an American rugby union player who currently plays for the Chicago Hounds of Major League Rugby (MLR). He also plays for the United States national rugby union team.

Amateur career
Campbell began playing rugby with the Royal Irish at Cathedral High School in Indianapolis. He studied business at Indiana University, and toured Australia with the College All-Americans in 2015.

Professional career
Campbell spent a season with the Glendale Raptors of Major League Rugby in 2018, reaching the MLR Championship game against the Seattle Seawolves. 

Campbell signed for London Irish for the 2018–19 season. He was released ahead of the 2020–21 season. He signed with MLR's Austin Gilgronis for the 2021 season and became the team's captain, the 4th in franchise history.

International
Campbell first rose to national prominence when one of his runs playing for the USA Selects against Canada A appeared on ESPN's highlights. 

Campbell debuted for the United States national team in November 2016, and played for the U.S. the following week against Romania in November 2016.

References

Rugby union players from Indiana
1994 births
Indiana Hoosiers athletes
Living people
Place of birth missing (living people)
American Raptors players
United States international rugby union players
London Irish players
Rugby union centres
American rugby union players
Austin Gilgronis players
Chicago Hounds (rugby union) players